中山 is an East Asian name composed of two characters which individually mean "middle" or "centre" and "mountain" or "hill".

中山 may refer to:
Chūzan (中山王国), one of the three kingdoms that controlled Okinawa in the 14th century

People with the given name
Sun Yat-sen (孫中山 Sūn Zhōngshān, 1866–1925), Chinese revolutionary and political leader

See also

Chung Shan (disambiguation), the Chinese Wade–Giles transliteration
Nakayama (disambiguation), the Japanese transliteration
Zhongshan (disambiguation), the Chinese pinyin transliteration